Howell Island Conservation Area protected area covering  and managed by the Missouri Department of Conservation on Howell Island located in the Missouri River in Boone Township, St. Charles County, Missouri, although the MDOC land surrounding the parking area is in St. Louis County.  The island is bounded by the Missouri River on the north side and Centaur Chute to the south.  The island is mostly forested in bottomland trees such as sycamore and cottonwood.

History 
The island was named for either Thomas or John Howell, who were early settlers in the area. The island was purchased by the Department of Conservation in 1978. The island was submerged during the Great Flood of 1993.

Geography 
This is a low lying, tree-covered island in the Missouri River.

Recreation 
The area provides a limited amount of recreational activities.  Camping is permitted by boaters who are traveling the Missouri River between April 1 and September 30, so long as they camp within  of the river. There is an  multi-use trail on the island open to hiking and biking. Horses are not permitted on the island.

Hunting and fishing 
Hunting is permitted during hunting season provided that regulations are followed. Deer hunting is permitted by archery only.

References 

Conservation Areas of Missouri
River islands of Missouri
Islands of the Missouri River
Protected areas established in 1978
Protected areas of St. Charles County, Missouri
Landforms of St. Charles County, Missouri